Mud Creek is a stream in the U.S. state of Georgia. It is a tributary to Noses Creek.

References

Rivers of Georgia (U.S. state)
Rivers of Bartow County, Georgia